Taipalsaari is a municipality of Finland. It is located in the province of Southern Finland and is part of the South Karelia region. Neighbouring municipalities are Lappeenranta, Lemi, Puumala, Ruokolahti and Savitaipale. The municipality is unilingually Finnish.

The average temperature during the summer months on Taipalsaari is the highest among Finnish municipalities.

References

External links

Municipality of Taipalsaari – Official website 
GoTaipalsaari – Tourist information
goSaimaa.com – travel information

Municipalities of South Karelia
Populated places established in 1571
1571 establishments in Sweden